Beans the Cat is an animated cartoon character in the Warner Bros. Cartoons series of cartoons from 1935–1936. Beans was the third Warner Bros cartoon character star after Bosko and Buddy. He is voiced by Billy Bletcher and occasionally by Tommy Bond. He was created by director Friz Freleng. The character was featured in nine cartoons made in 1935 and 1936.

History
When the cartoon animators/directors Hugh Harman and Rudolf Ising left producer Leon Schlesinger in 1933, they took their main creation, Bosko, with them to Metro-Goldwyn Mayer. Desperate to maintain his contract with Warner Bros., Schlesinger founded an animation studio of his own, Leon Schlesinger Productions, to produce new Looney Tunes and Merrie Melodies cartoons in-house and collected employees from Disney, Ub Iwerks, and other animation studios. Schlesinger set up his new studio on the Warner Bros. lot, on Sunset Boulevard. Among the staff Schlesinger had accrued was Tom Palmer, a former Disney animator who was appointed director of Looney Tunes and Merrie Melodies.

Schlesinger intended to effectively compete with Disney and Fleischer Studios, and he needed a continuing, star character to compete with Mickey Mouse and Betty Boop. Palmer introduced Buddy to be that character. Like Bosko and Mickey, Buddy had a girlfriend and a pet dog as supporting characters. The Buddy character, however, was not a success and Palmer was fired after completing two short films for Schlesinger. Following the departure of Palmer's replacement, Earl Duvall, Schlesinger ran short of directors (composer Bernard B. Brown even receiving credits for directing two Merrie Melodies shorts) and began to search for new directors to effectively keep the Schlesinger studio afloat. According to animation historian Michael Barrier, all the animated short films produced by the Schlesinger studio under its early directors lacked in cuteness and charm of any kind and were frequently incoherent. The shorts of this period had much smaller production budgets than their main competitor, Disney.

By 1934, Schlesinger had assigned directorial duties on the Merrie Melodies series to former Harman-Ising animator Friz Freleng, and the Looney Tunes series to Jack King. Schlesinger tasked the two with creating new characters to replace the sterile Buddy, and the two created a group of anthropomorphic animals to show to Schlesinger, which included Beans, a mischievous cat, Little Kitty, a female cat and Beans' love interest, twin puppies named Ham and Ex, Oliver Owl, a stubborn, spectacled owl, and Porky, a stuttering pig. Beans and his friends made their first appearances on I Haven't Got a Hat, a Merrie Melodies animated short directed by Freleng. The Merrie Melodies series lacked continuing characters by this point. But the film served as a showcase for the new characters, that were being groomed to replace Buddy as the stars of the Looney Tunes series. Schlesinger hoped that some of them would catch on with audiences and become bankable stars, and when the characters became popular with audiences, Buddy was discontinued and Beans became the star of Looney Tunes.

Beans' first "crack at stardom" was his first solo Looney Tunes film, A Cartoonist's Nightmare. The film was directed by Jack King, who would go on to direct a total of eight animated shorts featuring Beans before returning to Disney in 1936. Michael Barrier describes Beans under King's direction as resembling the Mickey Mouse version of the early 1930s. Their designs were certainly similar, with both characters having a white face and black body. But in characterization Beans was a pint-sized hero, resembling the plucky, boyish, and heroic Mickey featured in The Klondike Kid (1932) and The Mail Pilot (1933). Beans was voiced by Billy Bletcher and Tommy Bond.

Also in 1935, the studio gained a third full-time director, working in addition to Freleng and King. He was Tex Avery, a former inker for the short-lived Winkler Studio and the Universal Studio Cartoons. Avery had started working as an inker in 1928 and was promoted to an animator by 1930. While at Universal, he used to work under director Bill Nolan. Nolan used to delegate work to Avery, and Avery reportedly was the uncredited de facto director for a couple of films credited to Nolan. Avery had lost his job in Universal in April 1935, and was hired by Schlesinger a few months later. According to a later interview with Avery, Avery had falsely claimed that he was an experienced director when applying for the job: "'Hey, I'm a director.' Hell! I was no more a director than nothing, but with my loud mouth, I talked him [Schlesinger] into it." Avery's production unit received its own building within the studio lot. Avery got exclusive use of four animators for his unit: Bob Clampett, Chuck Jones, Sid Sutherland, and Virgil Ross. The first animated short film produced by this unit was Gold Diggers of '49 (1935), the third Looney Tunes film starring Beans. Beans was also featured in the film's title card, signifying that he was the intended protagonist. The film had a Western setting and cast Beans as a gold miner. Also featured in the film was a redesigned Porky Pig, making his second appearance.

Beans began appearing with characters from the cast of I Haven't Got a Hat, most frequently Porky Pig. However, after a number of Porky and Beans outings, it became clear that the character audiences were talking about was Beans' stuttering sidekick, Porky Pig, and after Westward Whoa, Beans was phased out and Porky replaced him as the star of Looney Tunes.

According to Barrier, Beans made one last appearance in Shanghaied Shipmates (1936), a short film directed by Jack King. It was to be the last animated short featuring either Beans or the rest of the cast of I Haven't Got a Hat, with the exception of Porky Pig. Barrier suggests that Leon Schlesinger may have been giving Avery a vote of confidence, when deciding to keep only Porky as a continuing character and to drop Beans. Porky had already been the main star in Avery's films, while Beans had continued to serve as the main star of King's films. After losing use of Beans, Jack King directed only three films starring Porky Pig. By April 1936, King was hired again by the Disney studio. He would go on to serve as a director in films starring Donald Duck.

In 1937 and 1938, Schlesinger's studio began creating various potential replacements for Beans, producing characters such as Gabby Goat, Petunia Pig, Daffy Duck and a little white hare. Daffy would become Porky's most enduring comic partner, while Gabby and Petunia both disappeared after a few shorts; the white hare would rarely ever appear with Porky again but would, over the course of a few years, evolve into Warner Bros.'s biggest star, Bugs Bunny.

Filmography

References

Sources
 

Looney Tunes characters
 
Anthropomorphic cats
Film characters introduced in 1935